The 1961 Open Championship was held at the Royal Automobile Club in Pall Mall, London from 29 November - 4 December 1960.Once again the Open championship was held during the previous December to avoid a clash with the professional championship. This method would be used until 1969.
Azam Khan won his third consecutive title beating Mo Khan in the final. A third place play off also took place in which Roshan Khan defeated Denis Hughes 9-3 9-0 9-3.

Seeds

Draw and results

Section 1

Section 2

+ amateur
^ seeded

Semi-finals & Final

References

Men's British Open Squash Championships
Men's British Open Championship
Men's British Open Squash Championship
Men's British Open Squash Championship
Men's British Open Squash Championship
Men's British Open Squash Championship
Squash competitions in London